The Greenock Telegraph is a local daily newspaper serving Inverclyde (the council area containing the towns of Gourock, Greenock and Port Glasgow), Scotland.

Founded in 1857, it was the first halfpenny daily newspaper in Britain. It was for a time Greenock Telegraph and Clyde Shipping Gazette, owing to the massive amount of maritime traffic moving in and out of Greenock's harbours. This information is still published, but only as a column entry.

Originally based in Charles Street, Greenock, the printing works were bombed during the Greenock Blitz in May 1941. However the printers worked on to produce emergency editions, despite sustaining multiple cuts from the shattered glass lodged in the presses.

It is known locally as The Tele (although this is pronounced Tilly). Several features such as Viator (Latin for traveller) have formed part of the Telegraph for decades. Although it concerns itself primarily with news from Inverclyde, West Renfrewshire and North Ayrshire it occasionally runs national stories on its front and inner pages.

The paper was printed on site at its current location in Crawfurd Street in Greenock from the 1960s. Long published by Orr, Pollock & Co., it was published by Clyde & Forth Press, who owned a range of local titles in Central Scotland and a few titles in the south of England. The company went into receivership after the death of Deirdre Romanes and were acquired by management and Lloyds Bank under the name Romanes Media in 2012. Newsquest acquired Romanes Media in 2015.

In 2016, citing "challenging trading conditions" Newsquest Scotland closed the former departments of Romanes Media Group in Clydebank and Greenock, which housed its art desk and sub-editing operations, while its credit control and accountancy departments in Greenock also closed with the loss of a further four jobs; since then, the Telegraph has been printed off-site at Newsquest's press at Carmyle, just southeast of Glasgow. The building that housed the original printing press was stripped out and sold to a local car sales dealership.

In 2022, the newspaper's main office was significantly remodelled with most internal structures being stripped out, editorial and advertising teams relocated, and the remaining building being sub-let as hireable storage space. 

The newspaper archive is held at the Watt Institution who have original copies dating back to 1857 which can be viewed on microfilm. 

The current Managing Editor is Brian Hossack, who won Newsquest's Editor of the Year for 2016.

References

External links 
Newspaper website

Newspapers published in Scotland
Publications established in 1857
1857 establishments in Scotland
Daily newspapers published in the United Kingdom
Greenock